Istrianis femoralis is a moth of the family Gelechiidae. It is found on Sicily, Cyprus and in Italy, Slovenia, Croatia, North Macedonia, Greece, the Crimea and Turkey.

The wingspan is 9–10 mm.

The larvae feed on Pistacia mutica and Pistacia vera.

References

Moths described in 1876
Istrianis